Peter Joseph Beck is a New Zealand entrepreneur and founder of Rocket Lab, an aerospace manufacturer and launch service provider. Before founding the company, Beck worked in various occupations and built rocket-powered contraptions.

Early life 
Beck grew up in Invercargill, New Zealand with two brothers: Andrew and John. His father, Russell Beck, was a museum and art gallery director and gemologist, and his mother was a teacher. As a teenager, he spent time turbocharging an old Mini and launching water rockets. Beck has never attended university.

In 1995, Beck became a tool-and-die-maker apprentice at Fisher & Paykel company. While working there, he taught himself and used the company workshop to experiment with rockets and propellants. Using these tools and materials, he created a rocket bike, rocket-attached scooter, and a jet pack. Later, Beck moved into product design department and bought a cruise missile engine from the United States. He then worked in New Plymouth as a project engineer on a yacht.

He later worked at Industrial Research Limited between 2001 and 2006, working on smart materials, composites and superconductors. While working there, he met Stephen Tindall, who later became an early investor at Rocket Lab. While his wife worked as an engineer in the United States, Beck traveled to Minnesota and met with a rocketeer that he had contacted beforehand. After this travel, he founded Rocket Lab.

Business career 

While contacting potential investors, Beck met New Zealand internet entrepreneur Mark Rocket, later becoming a key seed investor to Rocket Lab. Among other early investors into Rocket Lab was Stephen Tindall, Vinod Khosla, and the New Zealand Government. Three years later, in November 2009, Rocket Lab successfully launched the multi-stage rocket Ātea-1, becoming the first private company in the Southern Hemisphere to reach space.

Around 2013, Rocket Lab moved its registration from New Zealand to the United States, and opened headquarters in Huntington Beach, California. The company then developed and first launched the Electron rocket unsuccessfully in May 2017. The rocket's first successful launch happened in January 2018, deploying two CubeSats and the Humanity Star. In May 2022, the company attempted to recover an Electron booster with partial success. As of October 2022, the company has successfully launched in total 28 similar missions out of 31 attempts.

Accolades 
In 2015, Beck received the New Zealander of the Year Award in the Innovator of the Year category. In 2019, he was appointed as an adjunct professor for the University of Auckland. Both Rocket Lab and Beck are awarded the Pickering Medal by the Royal Society Te Apārangi in 2020.

References 

Living people
People from Invercargill
New Zealand businesspeople
New Zealand engineers
New Zealand expatriates in the United States
1970s births